Bani Al-Dhahatin is a sub-district located in Hubaysh District, Ibb Governorate, Yemen. Bani Al-Dhahatin had a population of 9297 according to the 2004 census.

References 

Sub-districts in Hubaysh District